The Cheiridioidea are a superfamily of pseudoscorpions. The superfamily contains two families:

Cheiridiidae
Sternophoridae

References

 

 
Arachnid superfamilies